The Mad Love Tour is the fourth concert tour by American recording artist JoJo. The tour supported her third studio album, Mad Love (2016).

Background
JoJo announced that the tour would launch in early 2017, after a performance of "No Apologies" on Today. On November 29, 2016, dates for the Mad Love Tour were announced through JoJo's social media accounts and official website.

Due to high demand for the initial date at KOKO, a second show was added in London, at Heaven on February 1. On February 14, 2017, JoJo announced during a Facebook live chat that the tour would expand to Canada with an additional 6 dates added to the tour. Pre-sale tickets were made available on Thursday, February 16 through her official website with general public tickets going on sale Friday, February 17.

On February 20, 2017, JoJo announced the cancellation of her San Luis Obispo, California tour stop due to a viral illness. JoJo performed the following date on February 21, 2017 in Los Angeles, California before cancelling and rescheduling several following dates due to a laryngitis infection.

Promotion
In Europe, pre-sale and VIP tickets for the tour went on sale on November 30, 2016, with general public tickets going on sale on December 2, 2016. VIP packages for the tour included one General Admission ticket, access to a VIP meet and greet with JoJo, VIP exclusive poster, laminate, tote bag and wristband.

Set list
This set list is representative of the performance on January 15, 2017. It is not representative of all concerts for the duration of the show.

"Clovers"
"When Love Hurts"
"Leave (Get Out)"
"Vibe"
"Say Love"
"High Heels"
"Like That/Like This"
"Reckless"
"Edibles"
"Music."
"Baby It's You"
"Disaster"
"We Get By"
"Marvins Room (Can't Do Better)" 
"Too Little Too Late"
"Weak" 
"I Am"
"FAB."
"Fuck Apologies."
"Mad Love" (interpolates Mariah Carey's "Vision of Love")
Encore
"Good Thing"

Tour dates

 Notes

  The April 29, 2017, concert in New Haven, Connecticut is part of the Yale University's annual spring music festival "Spring Fling 2017", where JoJo will headline.
  The May 16, 2017, show was originally scheduled for February 20, 2017, however was cancelled and later rescheduled, due to laryngitis.
  The May 17, 2017, show was originally scheduled for February 23, 2017, however was cancelled and later rescheduled, due to laryngitis.
  The May 19, 2017, show was originally scheduled for February 25, 2017, however was cancelled and later rescheduled, due to laryngitis.
  The May 21, 2017, show was originally scheduled for February 24, 2017, however was cancelled and later rescheduled, due to laryngitis.
  The May 23, 2017, show was originally scheduled for February 27, 2017, however was cancelled and later rescheduled, due to laryngitis.
  The May 24, 2017, show was originally scheduled for March 1, 2017, however was cancelled and later rescheduled, due to laryngitis.
  The May 26, 2017, show was originally scheduled for March 3, 2017, however was cancelled and later rescheduled, due to laryngitis.

References

External links
 Official Website

2017 concert tours